Nicolás Ignacio Ovalle Raffo (born April 12, 2000) is a Chilean soccer player who plays as a midfielder for Spanish club Andratx in the Tercera Federación.

Early career
Ovalle Raffo began playing with La Roca Futbol Club in South Weber, Utah when he was seven. Afterwards he joined Real Salt Lake Arizona, a satellite team of the Real Salt Lake Academy. In 2018, he moved to the youth system of Chilean club Unión Española. In December 2019, after being told he wouldn't be extended with Unión Española, he returned home to his family in the United States, and was soon invited to try out with Toronto FC II in the new year, where his brother played.

Club career
On July 6, 2020, he signed a professional contract with Toronto FC II of USL League One. He was unable to appear for the team in 2020, as the club withdrew from the 2020 season due to the COVID-19 pandemic, although the club picked up his option for the 2021 season. He made his debut on July 23 in a substitute appearance against New England Revolution II.

In 2022, he began training with Spanish club CD Atlético Baleares, but was unable to sign due to a quota issue, but was invited to train with the team for the next six months, with the aim of signing with the club in January. In February 2023, he signed with Andratx in the Tercera Federación. He made his debut on February 12 against Constància.

International career
Ovalle Raffo is of Chilean and Italian descent and also holds a US Green Card. He has represented Chile at the youth level and was named to the premiminary roster for the Chile U17 national team for the 2017 FIFA U-17 World Cup.

Personal
He is the son of former footballer Adolfo Ovalle and the younger brother of footballer Adolfo Ovalle.

Career statistics

Club

References

2000 births
Living people
Footballers from Santiago
Chilean footballers
Chilean expatriate footballers
Unión Española footballers
Real Salt Lake players
Toronto FC II players
USL League One players
Chilean expatriate sportspeople in the United States
Chilean expatriate sportspeople in Canada
Expatriate soccer players in the United States
Expatriate soccer players in Canada
Association football midfielders
Tercera Federación players
CE Andratx footballers